This is the list of marine mammals found in Australian waters. It is a sub-list of the list of mammals of Australia.

Conservation status listed follows the IUCN Red List of Threatened Species (v. 2013.2; data current at 3 March 2014):

Cetacea

Balaenidae

 Southern right whale, Eubalaena australis

Balaenopteridae

 Minke whale, Balaenoptera acutorostrata 
 Southern minke whale, Balaenoptera bonaerensis 
 Sei whale, Balaenoptera borealis 
 Pygmy Bryde's whale, Balaenoptera edeni 
 Omura's whale, Balaenoptera omurai 
 Blue whale, Balaenoptera musculus  (ssp. brevicauda – pygmy blue whale: ,)
 Fin whale, Balaenoptera physalus 
 Humpback whale, Megaptera novaeangliae 

Delphinidae

 Short-beaked common dolphin, Delphinus delphis 
 Pygmy killer whale, Feresa attenuata 
 Short-finned pilot whale, Globicephala macrorhynchus 
 Long-finned pilot whale, Globicephala melas 
 Risso's dolphin, Grampus griseus 
 Fraser's dolphin, Lagenodelphis hosei 
 Hourglass dolphin, Sagmatias cruciger 
 Dusky dolphin, Sagmatias obscurus 
 Southern right whale dolphin, Lissodelphis peronii 
 Irrawaddy dolphin, Orcaella brevirostris 
 Australian snubfin dolphin, Orcaella heinsohni 
 Orca (killer whale), Orcinus orca 
 Melon-headed whale, Peponocephala electra 
 False killer whale, Pseudorca crassidens 
 Indo-Pacific humpback dolphin, Sousa chinensis  
 Pantropical spotted dolphin, Stenella attenuata 
 Striped dolphin, Stenella coeruleoalba 
 Spinner dolphin, Stenella longirostris 
 Rough-toothed dolphin, Steno bredanensis 
 Indo-Pacific bottlenose dolphin, Tursiops aduncus 
 Burrunan dolphin, Tursiops australis (T. truncatus: ,)
 Bottlenose dolphin, Tursiops truncatus

Kogiidae

 Pygmy sperm whale, Kogia breviceps 
 Dwarf sperm whale, Kogia simus

Neobalaenidae

 Pygmy right whale, Caperea marginata

Phocoenidae

 Spectacled porpoise, Phocoena dioptrica

Physeteridae

 Sperm whale, Physeter macrocephalus

Ziphiidae

 Arnoux's beaked whale, Berardius arnuxii 
 Southern bottlenose whale, Hyperoodon planifrons 
 Longman's beaked whale, Indopacetus pacificus 
 Andrews' beaked whale, Mesoplodon bowdoini 
 Blainville's beaked whale, Mesoplodon densirostris 
 Ginkgo-toothed beaked whale, Mesoplodon ginkgodens 
 Gray's beaked whale, Mesoplodon grayi 
 Hector's beaked whale, Mesoplodon hectori 
 Strap-toothed whale, Mesoplodon layardii 
 True's beaked whale, Mesoplodon mirus 
 Shepherd's beaked whale, Tasmacetus shepherdi 
 Cuvier's beaked whale, Ziphius cavirostris

Sirenia
Dugongidae
 Dugong, Dugong dugon

Carnivora

Pinnipedia

Otariidae

 Australian fur seal, Arctocephalus pusillus 
New Zealand fur seal, Arctocephalus forsteri 
 Antarctic fur seal, Arctocephalus gazella 
 Subantarctic fur seal, Arctocephalus tropicalis 
 Australian sea lion, Neophoca cinerea 
 New Zealand sea lion, Phocarctos hookeri

Phocidae

 Leopard seal, Hydrurga leptonyx 
 Weddell seal, Leptonychotes weddellii 
 Crabeater seal, Lobodon carcinophaga 
 Southern elephant seal, Mirounga leonina 
 Ross seal, Ommatophoca rossii

See also
 List of mammals of Australia
 List of monotremes and marsupials of Australia
 List of bats of Australia
 List of rodents of Australia
 List of placental mammals introduced to Australia

References 

Marine mammals
Marine mammals